Gabriel Bo Durkac (born December 12, 1972) is an American college baseball coach and former third baseman. He is the hitting and infield coach at the University of South Florida. Durkac played college baseball at the University of North Carolina at Chapel Hill in 1992 and Virginia Tech from 1993 to 1995 and Arizona State University before pursuing a professional career. He served as the head baseball coach at Illinois State University from 2015 to 2018.

Playing career
Durkac began his college career at the University of North Carolina at Chapel Hill, where he hit .226 as a freshman. After being told he would not have much of an opportunity to play much as a sophomore, he transferred to Virginia Tech. While he was at Virginia Tech, he was twice named an All-Metro Conference honoree.

Coaching career
On June 10, 2002, Durkac was hired as an assistant at the University of North Carolina at Charlotte.

In 2009, he was hired by Illinois State as an assistant coach working primarily with hitters and infielders. On June 23, 2014, Durkac was promoted to head baseball coach. He was fired on May 29, 2018, after compiling a 82–134 record.

On July 26, 2018, Durkac was named the volunteer assistant at the University of Miami, working with infielders and hitters. He was then named the infielder and hitting coach at the University of South Florida, as well as recruiting coordinator on July 16, 2019.

Head coaching record

References

External links

South Florida Bulls bio

1972 births
Living people
Adirondack Lumberjacks players
Baseball players from Pennsylvania
Baseball third basemen
Charlotte 49ers baseball coaches
Chico Heat players
High Desert Mavericks players
Illinois State Redbirds baseball coaches
Long Island Ducks players
Miami Hurricanes baseball coaches
North Carolina Tar Heels baseball players
People from Kittanning, Pennsylvania
Sonoma County Crushers players
South Florida Bulls baseball coaches
Virginia Tech Hokies baseball players
Visalia Oaks players